The Net is the seventh studio album by Australian group, Little River Band. The Net was released in May 1983 and peaked at No. 11 on the Australian Kent Music Report Albums Chart and No. 61 on the Billboard 200.

The Net was their first full studio release to feature John Farnham as new lead vocalist, replacing Glenn Shorrock and Stephen Housden taking over as lead guitarist. It was also the last album featuring original member Beeb Birtles, who left the line-up after the US tour in support of its release, and drummer Derek Pellicci, who would rejoin the band in 1987.

Reception
Cash Box magazine said "Although Glen Shorrock's vocals have been replaced by John Farnham's, the original core of the band is still the same as when it began back in 1975. In the past seven years, LRB released about a half-dozen memorable mellow-rock albums, and considering the group's loyal following, it's a cinch that The Net will be another big seller. 'We Two', the disc's first single, is already scaling the charts."

Track listing
 Side A
"You're Driving Me Out of My Mind" (B. Birtles, G. Goble) - 5:11
"We Two" (G. Goble) - 4:32
"No More Tears" (B. Birtles) - 3:20
"Mr. Socialite" (B. Birtles) - 5:24
"Down on the Border" (G. Goble) - 2:56

 Side B
"The Danger Sign" (B. Birtles, F. Howson) - 4:02
"Falling" (Housden, Wakeford) - 4:19
"Sleepless Nights" (G. Goble) - 5:10
"Easy Money" (G. Goble) - 4:02
"The Net" (G. Goble) - 4:42
"One Day" (G. Goble) - 2:38 (not on original vinyl recording, appeared on 1997 CD reissue)

Personnel
John Farnham - vocals
Beeb Birtles - guitars, vocals
Graham Goble - guitars, vocals
David Hirschfelder – keyboards, synthesizers
Stephen Housden - guitar, vocals
Wayne Nelson - bass guitar, vocals
Derek Pellicci - drums, percussion
Additional musicians
Jon Clarke – saxophones, horns

Charts

References

1983 albums
Capitol Records albums
Little River Band albums